Civilisées (A Civilized People or Al Mutahaddirat) is a 1999 Lebanese comedy drama film directed and written by Randa Chahal Sabag, a renowned Lebanese film maker and screenwriter.

Synopsis
The film is a dark comedy/drama about the Lebanese Civil War (1975-1990). During the civil war, many well-off Lebanese families fled the country to look for their personal interests internationally, leaving behind their residences under the care of maids and laborers from Egypt, the Philippines and Sri Lanka. The film draws the portrait of a war-tormented Beirut neighborhood, and the love between a Muslim militia fighter and a Christian maid.

Critical response
Due to the controversial topic of the film, it was only screened once in Lebanon at the Beirut International Film Festival and was later banned by the Lebanese film commission. However, it received positive responses from international audiences.
The film was well appreciated by the Arab Film Festival which took place in San Francisco, CA.

It also received positive responses at film festivals in Italy, France and Canada.

Cast
  as Viviane
 Tamim Chahal as Samir
 Myrna Maakaron as Souad
 Carmen Lebbos as Najat
 Bruno Todeschini as Antoine

Crew
Executive Producers : Daniel Toscan du Plantier, Frédéric Sichler
Co-producer : Anne Fleischl
Directors of Photography : Ricardo Jacques, Gale Breidi, Roby Breidi
Sound Recordists : Nicolas Cantin, Dominique Gaborieau
Press Attachés (film) : Denise Breton, Isabelle Duvoisin
Production Designer : Sylvian Chauvelot
Costume Designer : Souraya Bagdadi

References
https://web.archive.org/web/20111022084137/http://arteeast.org/pages/cinema/series/TheCalmAfterTheStorm/935/
http://www.answers.com/topic/civilis-es
http://www.unifrance.org/film/16045/civilisees
http://www.arabfilmfestival.org/film_detail.php?id=885

External links

1990s black comedy films
1999 comedy-drama films
1990s French-language films
1990s Arabic-language films
Lebanese Civil War films
Lebanese comedy-drama films
Films directed by Randa Chahal Sabag
1999 multilingual films
Lebanese multilingual films